Ladislav Toman (19 June 1894 – 29 May 1935) was a Czech sculptor. His work was part of the sculpture event in the art competition at the 1936 Summer Olympics.

References

1894 births
1935 deaths
20th-century Czech sculptors
20th-century male artists
Czech male sculptors
Olympic competitors in art competitions
People from Tábor District